Dirtyphonics is a French electronic music band from Paris, consisting of members Charly Barranger and Julien "PitchIn" Corrales. Their music style is based on dubstep, drum and bass, drumstep.

In 2008, Dirtyphonics signed on Shimon's label AudioPorn Records and released their debut single, "French F**k" which reached number one on Beatport's charts. After releasing remixes on many labels, such as Virgin Records, Atlantic Records, Warner Bros. Records, Sony Records, Mau5trap, Cooking Vinyl, Ram, MTA, Ultra Records, they joined Dim Mak Records in 2012. Dirtyphonics has worked with Linkin Park, Skrillex, Kaskade, Benny Benassi, Foreign Beggars, NERO, Modestep, Steve Aoki, Marilyn Manson, and many more through collaborations and remixes.

In March 2013, Dirtyphonics released their debut full-length album Irreverence which merges heavy bass music, drum and bass, dubstep, and electro. The first single from the album, "Dirty," was released in October 2012, followed by "Walk In The Fire," "No Stopping Us," and "Hanging On Me" in 2013, with remixes covering most genres of electronic music.

After 2 years of a worldwide tour, the band released their "Write Your Future" EP, on which they re-assess their love for melting genres together. The EP was released on 17 February 2015 and followed by the "Write Your Future – Remixes" EP in September of the same year.

History

Formation and early career
Dirtyphonics was founded in 2004 and began performing live shows in 2006. For the first two years, the group consisted of Charly, Thomas Desbouvrie, and Pho. In 2008 PitchIn joined the fold. Their influences include Daft Punk and Pendulum, as well as metal bands such as Metallica and Korn. "Most of us started by playing in metal bands," recalls Charly. "Our sound was always meant to be powerful, high-impact, and precise. From the day we’ve started, we’ve challenged ourselves to create something new - we love to push boundaries." The boys did just that in translating the energy and excitement from their head-banging days to the emergent world of electronic dance music.

In 2008, the group signed to Shimon's label, AudioPorn Records. They released their first single that year, the aptly named "French F**k" which quickly rose to the number one spot on Beatport's charts and stayed there for several weeks. Follow-up singles "Quarks" and "Vandals" proved the act's ascension was no fluke, showcasing the group's signature style-shifting low-end heavy sound. The group quickly became a hot commodity in the remix world, lending their talents to tracks by the likes of Skrillex, The Bloody Beetroots, Marilyn Manson, Benny Benassi, Excision, Datsik, Borgore, Nero, and Linkin Park. In 2013, Thomas quit the band to become a painter as "Matheo de Bruvisso".

2013: Irreverence
In 2009, they earned "Best Newcomer Producer" honor at the Drum & Bass Arena Awards. The next three years were a busy time for Dirtyphonics. They headlined sold-out shows worldwide with everyone from Skrillex and Knife Party to Steve Aoki and DJ Snake. They also made notable appearances at festivals like EDC, Glastonbury Festival, SXSW, Pukkelpop, WMC, Tomorrowland and countless others.

On 19 March they released their first full-length album Irreverence on Dim Mak Records. The album is a heavy mix of anthemic electro, frenetic drum-step, thrash guitars, and pounding drums. It features notable collaborations with Steve Aoki, Foreign Beggars, and Modestep.

2015: Write Your Future
In early 2014, Thomas Desbouvrie resigned from the band to pursue his aspirations in Art. Although one member short, the band lost no speed and continued touring at major festivals worldwide. Finding a second wind in the studio, Dirtyphonics released a collaboration with Zeds Dead, Where Are You Now feat. Bright Lights on Mad Decent. In February 2015, the band released their sophomore Write Your Future EP  on Dim Mak Records including collaborations with UZ, 12th Planet, Trinidad James, Matt Rose and Julie Hardy. The band toured the US and Europe while continuing to write much music. Back from tour, the band released Anonymous in homage of their Drum and Bass roots and as a strong statement of their sound. Quickly after, the Write Your Future – Remixes EP came out on Dim Mak Records with remixes from Habstrakt, FuntCase, High Maintenance and Infuze. On 21 October 2015, the band released "Hoverboard", a song they wrote in 2005.

2017: Vantablack
In 2017 Dirtyphonics join Monstercat to release their “Vantablack EP” in collaboration with Sullivan King. This EP re-asses their metal roots and cements the heaviness and diversity of their sound. Songs like “Hammer”, “Sight Of Your Soul” and “Vantablack’” gathered over 15M streams on Spotify and landed on major playlists.

2019 to present: LIIVE
In 2019 they created and designed a brand new show to celebrate 10 years on the road. With their new “Dirtyphonics LIIVE”, Charly and Pitchin have been headlining festivals all over Europe as an hommage to their roots. They have been working intensively on exclusive music and visuals to create a unique experience ready to take you on a very special journey. Through joining the Disciple records family they released the iconic “Scars EP”, “Rise From The Dead”, "Gasoline" as well as many collaborations and remixes. 

In 2020 Dirtyphonics has stepped up their role of ambassador of the French Bass Music by helping and pushing established and up coming French producers to the limelight. There are some very exciting projects and collaborations on the way…

Discography

Studio albums

Extended plays

Singles

Remixes
 PhaseOne - "Break Em" (Dirtyphonics Remix) - 2020
 Zeds Dead - "Blame" (Dirtyphonics Remix) - 2017
 The Chainsmokers - "Closer" (Dirtyphonics Remix) - 2016
 Skrillex and Alvin Risk - "Try It Out" (Dirtyphonics Remix) - 2016
 Steve Aoki - "Neon Future" (Dirtyphonics Remix) - 2015
 Le Castle Vania - "Disintegrate" (Dirtyphonics Remix) - 2014
 Kaskade and Project 46 - "Last Chance" (Dirtyphonics Remix) - 2013 
 Steve Aoki and Rune RK featuring RAS - "Bring You To Life" (Dirtyphonics Remix) - 2013 
 Linkin Park - Lies Greed Misery (Dirtyphonics Remix) - 2013 
 Borgore - Legend (Dirtyphonics Remix) - 2013
 12th Planet & Flinch - "The End Is Near Part 1" (Dirtyphonics Remix) - 2012
 Foreign Beggars - "Apex" (Dirtyphonics Remix) - 2012
 Marilyn Manson - "Slo-Mo-Tion" (Dirtyphonics Remix) - 2012
 Excision & Datsik - "Deviance" (Dirtyphonics Remix) - 2012
 Krewella - "Killin it" (Dirtyphonics Remix) - 2012
 Krafty Kuts featuring Dynamite MC - "Pounding" (Dirtyphonics Remix) - 2011
 Dan Sena featuring Del The Funky Homosapien & Kylee Swenson - "Song Of Siren" (Dirtyphonics Remix) - 2011
 The Crystal Method featuring The Heavy - "Play For Real" (Dirtyphonics Remix) - 2011
 Skrillex - "Scary Monsters and Nice Sprites" (Dirtyphonics Remix) - 2011
 Does It Offend You, Yeah? - "Wondering" (Dirtyphonics Remix) - 2011
 Benny Benassi featuring T-Pain  - "Electroman" (Dirtyphonics Remix) - 2011
 Nero  - "Me & You" (Dirtyphonics Remix) - 2011
 Shimon - "The Shadow Knows" (Dirtyphonics Remix) - 2010
 The Bloody Beetroots  - "Warp" (Dirtyphonics Remix) - 2010
 ShockOne  - "Polygon" (Dirtyphonics Remix) - 2010
 Aki & Cody-C - "Reggaetronik" (Dirtyphonics Remix) - 2006

Awards
 Best Newcomer Producers (DNB Arena Awards 2009)
 Best Band Or Duo (DJ Mag FR)

References

Sources
Knowledge Magazine (September 2008)
Knowledge Magazine (March 2009)
ATM Magazine (April 2009)
International DJ Magazine (August 2009)
 Interview with Broken Beats (September 2009) 
TRAX Magazine (August 2010)
BBC 1XTRA Crissy Criss Show (August 2009)

External links
 

French electronic music groups
Club DJs
Remixers
French electronic musicians
Dubstep music groups
Monstercat artists